Riding to Win is an Australian comedy drama silent film starring Australian gangster Squizzy Taylor and his girlfriend Ida Pender. Made in 1922 it was banned by the Victorian censor but obtained release in Sydney and Brisbane under the title Bound to Win. It is considered a lost film.

Plot
A heroic jockey (Taylor) saves his girlfriend (Pender), the daughter of a horse trainer, from a criminal gang determined to stop him from riding the race favourite to win in the Eclipse Steeplechase.

Production
At the peak of Squizzy Taylor's fame, he was contacted by producer-director Eric Harrison who convinced Taylor and his then-girlfriend Pender to star in a sporting comedy drama which would exploit Taylor's experience as a jockey. Shooting took place in 1922 in Melbourne, with scenes shot at Caulfield and Moonee Valley. The working title was In Emergency Colours.

Reception
The film was banned from public screening by Victorian censor on the basis it was "representing two persons who figured recently in Criminal Court proceedings". Eventually Harrison obtained a release for the movie in under the title of Bound to Win in Sydney in 1923 and Brisbane in 1925. It is not known how well the film performed financially although a contemporary newspaper report claimed "large numbers of people visited" the Majestic Theatre to see the Brisbane premiere.

Taylor died in a gunfight in 1927.

References

Lost Australian films
1923 films
Australian silent feature films
Australian black-and-white films
Australian comedy-drama films
1923 comedy-drama films
1923 lost films
Lost comedy-drama films
Silent comedy-drama films